The 1916 United States presidential election in South Dakota took place on November 7, 1916 as part of the 1916 United States presidential election in which all contemporary forty-eight states participated. Voters chose five electors, or representatives to the Electoral College, who voted for president and vice president.

South Dakota voted for the Republican nominee, Supreme Court Justice Charles Evans Hughes of New York, over the Democratic nominee, incumbent President Woodrow Wilson of New Jersey. Hughes won South Dakota by a close margin of 3.90%; however, alongside Oregon, South Dakota was the only state that Hughes won in the Great Plains or westward.

Hughes’ victory was largely due to the powerful GOP loyalty of East River German-Americans, who feared that Wilson’s pro-British and pro-French sentiments would lead the United States to involve itself in war with Germany. In contrast, the more Anglo-Saxon West River counties strongly supported Wilson’s Southern roots and prohibitionist leanings. Despite his loss, Wilson’s 45.91% was the best performance in the state by a Democrat since William Jennings Bryan won the state in a fusion with the Populist Party two decades before, and would be beaten only six times in the ensuing century.

, this is the last election that Lawrence County voted for the Democratic presidential candidate, and the last election that South Dakota voted for a different presidential candidate than neighboring North Dakota.

Results

Results by county

See also
 United States presidential elections in South Dakota

References

1916
South Dakota
1916 South Dakota elections